So into You may refer to:

 "So into You" (Koda Kumi song), 2002
 "So Into You" (Tamia song), 1998
 "So into You" (The Wildhearts song), 2003
 "So in to You", a 1977 song by Atlanta Rhythm Section from their album A Rock and Roll Alternative

See also
"I'm So into You", a song by SWV
"I'm So into You", a song by Aaliyah from Age Ain't Nothing but a Number
"Sow into You", a song by Róisín Murphy from her 2005 album Ruby Blue
Into You (disambiguation)